White Stone is a UK based retailer of luxury ski wear and sporting goods.White Stone was opened in 2006.

White Stone's showroom and warehouse premises are in Harrogate, North Yorkshire, though they operate both nationally and internationally as an online retailer. They are renowned as a stockist of designer ski wear from international brands such as Bogner, Goldbergh, Descente, Schoffel, Fusalp, Perfect Moment and Poivre Blanc.

References

External links

Companies based in Harrogate
Sporting goods retailers of the United Kingdom